Placobdelloides siamensis  is a species of blood-feeding jawless leech in the family Glossiphoniidae. It is commonly known as the Siam shield leech and is a prevalent ectoparasite on Malayemys turtles but has a range of Geoemydidae hosts. In high numbers it can cause severe anaemia and malnutrition which can lead to the death of its host.

Taxonomy
The species was first described as Hemiclepsis siamensis by Oka in 1917 then transferred by Sawyer to his new genus Placobdelloides in 1986. In 2018, it was redescribed from specimens collected in Thailand.

Hosts

The type host is the Black Marsh Turtle, Siebenrockiella crassicollis. Other hosts include the Southeast Asian Box Turtle, Cuora amboinensis, the Yellow-headed Temple Turtle, Heosemys annandalii, the Mekong Snail-eating Turtle Malayemys subtrijuga, the Malayan Snail-eating Turtle Malayemys macrocephala, the Khorat Snail-eating Turtle Malayemys khoratensis, Oldham's lead turtle Cyclemys oldhamii and  the giant Asian pond turtle Heosemys grandis.

References

Leeches
Parasites of reptiles
Invertebrates of China
Invertebrates of Thailand
Animals described in 1917